The Mozambique Davis Cup team represents Mozambique in Davis Cup tennis competition and are governed by the Federação Moçambicana de Ténis. 

Mozambique currently compete in Africa Zone Group III.

History

Mozambique competed in its first Davis Cup in 2014.

Current team (2022) 

 Hercilio Rafael Seda
 Jossefa Simao Elias
 Armando Sigauque
 Jaime Sigauque

Head to head 
(by No. of ties)
 vs  2 ties 0–2
 vs  2 ties 0–2
 vs  1 tie 1–0
 vs  1 tie 1–0
 vs  1 tie 1–0
 vs  1 tie 0–1
 vs  1 tie 0–1

See also
Davis Cup
Mozambique Fed Cup team

External links

Davis Cup teams
Davis Cup
Davis Cup